Shchepkin is a rural locality (a khutor) in Volokonovsky District, Belgorod Oblast, Russia. The population was 133 as of 2010. There is 1 street.

Geography 
Shchepkin is located 13 km northeast of Volokonovka (the district's administrative centre) by road. Pokrovka is the nearest rural locality.

References 

Rural localities in Volokonovsky District